The Valencia Street Circuit was a street circuit in Valencia, Spain which hosted the Formula One European Grand Prix for five years (2008–2012). The first race meeting on the circuit was held over the 23/24 August 2008 weekend, with Felipe Massa winning the main event, the European Grand Prix, after starting from pole position. The circuit used the roads skirting the city's harbour and America's Cup port area – including a section over a  swing bridge – and also included some roads designed exclusively for racing purposes by the German architect Hermann Tilke, who also designed the infrastructure buildings for the circuit. The 2012 edition took place on 24 June and was the last to go under the name of the European Grand Prix until 2016, when the Baku City Circuit used the title for one year. It has not been used since 2013 after a deal fell through to alternate this venue with Catalunya in Barcelona to host the Spanish Grand Prix.

History 

The deal to host the Valencia race was signed on 1 June 2007, and was for seven years. The deal was made between Formula One supremo Bernie Ecclestone and the Valmor Sport group, led by former motorcycle racer Jorge "Aspar" Martínez and Villarreal CF's president Fernando Roig. The deal came about despite Ecclestone previously stating that no European country should hold more than one race each year, as there was already a Spanish Grand Prix at the Circuit de Catalunya.

Initially, the deal was rumoured to be conditional on the People's Party winning regional elections on 27 May 2007. On 16 May, Ecclestone clarified his comments, explaining "I said I wouldn't formalise a contract until after the elections because I didn't know who I would be signing it with" and claiming his earlier statements had been taken out of context. Ecclestone was later cleared of influencing the election by the Valencian Electoral Commission.

The official track layout was unveiled by Valencia Councillor and transport counselor, Mario Flores, on 19 July 2007. The track was first used in the last weekend of July 2008, as the circuit hosted a round of the Spanish F3 Championship and International GT Open. It was first used for the European Grand Prix on 24 August 2008.

Layout

Valencia was not as tight as Circuit de Monaco but overtaking opportunities were still scarce, due to the straights not being straight and the dust away from the racing line. Nico Hülkenberg noted there was quite a lot of space for a street circuit, and some corners had a lot of run-off area; Robert Kubica suggested that good traction and braking stability were crucial to win at the circuit, due to the number of long straights that ended in heavy braking zones.

The circuit was criticised by drivers for its lack of overtaking opportunities. Changes in Formula One in 2011, including the introduction of the Drag Reduction System and the switch to Pirelli tyres, partially improved that with 27 passes recorded in that year's race, 22 of which were accredited to the assistance of DRS. However, the five 'normal' overtakes still represented the year's second lowest total, although the adoption of two DRS zones for that year's race limited the potential for non-DRS assisted passes. Despite this, the 2012 race was shown to have many different overtakes and became one of the most thrilling races of the season. It also had many more retirements – a total in four in 2012 compared to zero retirements during the 2011 race.

A lap in a Formula One car

A curved 'straight' leads into a left-right chicane: turns 4 and 5, by the Neptune Hotel. Drivers exit the  chicane by running very close to the wall, before sweeping through the kinks of turns 6 and 7, then braking heavily for the following swing bridge section. Turn 14 is a medium speed right-hander before another, shorter DRS zone that leads through two left-hand kinks before the turn 17 hairpin at Museu de les Ciències Príncipe Felipe. A series of flat-out, or near flat-out sweeping curves follow, with the right-handers of turns 19 and 20 the most challenging of the bunch.

Lap records

The official race lap records at the Valencia Street Circuit are listed as:

See also
List of Formula One circuits
Circuit de Valencia – another motor racing circuit in Valencia used for MotoGP Valencian Community motorcycle Grand Prix.

References

External links

Official sites
The F1 Valencia Street Circuit Official Site

Non-official sites
The F1 Valencia Street Circuit Non-oficial Guide Site (in Spanish only)
Valencia Street Circuit guide from Official F1 Site
BBC's circuit guide
Valencia Street Circuit on Google Maps

Formula One circuits
Motorsport venues in the Valencian Community
Sports venues in the Valencian Community
Sports venues in Valencia
Tourist attractions in Valencia
Racing circuits designed by Hermann Tilke
Defunct motorsport venues in Spain